Anders Jochumsen (born 28 January 1981) is a Danish former professional footballer and current manager of Vigerslev Boldklub.

He has represented the Danish Under-21, Under-19,  Under-17 and Under-16 national teams a total of 25 times scoring 5 goals.

Career
Jochumsen started out as a trainee with Brøndby IF and has since represented several Danish clubs including Odense Boldklub and Akademisk Boldklub before moving to Lyngby Boldklub in the summer of 2006. He scored 16 league goals for Lyngby Boldklub in his first season with them. 

On August 7, 2007, he got a free transfer from Lyngby BK, the day after he announced that he would continue his career in Fremad Amager in the Danish Second Division. He played for the club until March 2009. Later he played for Brønshøj BK, Vanløse IF, Avedøre IF and Stenløse BK.

In June 2010 he was named joint manager of Stenløse BK together with Thomas Skov. In June 2011 he replaced Anders Sundstrup as manager of Greve Fodbold.

References 
  DBU
  Lyngby Boldklub
Anders Jochumsen ny assistent i Frem‚ bold.dk, 24 June 2016

1981 births
Living people
Danish men's footballers
Denmark under-21 international footballers
Denmark youth international footballers
Danish 1st Division players
Brøndby IF players
Akademisk Boldklub players
BK Skjold players
Herfølge Boldklub players
Køge Boldklub players
Odense Boldklub players
Lyngby Boldklub players
Brønshøj Boldklub players
Vanløse IF players
Association football forwards
People from Brøndby Municipality
Avedøre IF players
Sportspeople from the Capital Region of Denmark